The Philosophy Learning and Teaching Organization (PLATO) is a non-profit membership organization established to support the introduction of philosophy to pre-college students (K-12). It was established in 2009 by the American Philosophical Association's Committee on Pre-College-Instruction in Philosophy, and became an independent non-profit organization in 2012. PLATO sponsors the annual journal Questions: Philosophy for Young People. The organization's memberships are managed by the Philosophy Documentation Center.

Online resources for members
Members have online access to the following publications to support their research:
 Questions: Philosophy for Young People, 2001–present
 Teaching Ethics, 2001–present
 Teaching Philosophy, 1975–present
 Demonstrating Philosophy (anthology), 1988
 Teaching New Histories of Philosophy (conference proceeding), 2004
 Teaching Philosophy Today (anthology, 2nd edition), 2012
 The Journal of Pre-College Philosophy, Volumes 1-2 (1975-1977)>
 The Journal of Critical Analysis, Volumes 1-9 (1969-1992)

References

External links

 PLATO membership registration

Philosophy organizations
Organizations established in 2009
Teacher associations based in the United States